La Colonie was an independent cultural venue located in a former textile factory in the 10th arrondissement of Paris, near the Gare du Nord train station. It was founded by French artist Kader Attia and restaurateur Zico Selloum in 2016. It closed in March 2020 as a result of the COVID-19 pandemic.

History
La Colonie opened on 17 October 2016, to commemorate the 55th anniversary of the Paris Massacre of 1961, in which hundreds of National Liberation Front Algerians demonstrating for Algerian independence were killed by the French National Police.

In March 2020, La Colonie closed in response to the COVID-19 pandemic. Because La Colonie was dependent on revenue generated by its ground floor bar and café, it did not recover financially from the closure and has remained closed. Founder Kader Attia has indicated that the venue will persist but in a smaller, more affordable space in the Paris suburbs.

Programming
La Colonie was a multi-use space and functioned as a café and agora, in addition to a forum for workshops, lectures, readings, screenings, and art exhibitions with a focus on marginalized artists, thinkers, and activists whose work addressed issues of colonialism, racism, and cultural appropriation.

Notable exhibitions included:
 Opaque to herself: Poland and postcolonialism, November 2019 – 15 January 2020, curated by  Joanna Warsza
 The Trials of Justice, 29 May – 30 June 2019, curated by iLiana Fokianaki
 Noria: Investigative grounds on violence and the state, 18 May 2019
 Return of Fordlandia, an open-air archive, 13–25 November 2018
 Discreet Violence: Discreet Violence: Architecture and the French War in Algeria, 19 June – 14 July 2018, curated by Samia Henni
 CARACAS RESET, 15–17 May 2018

References

External links
 La Colonie website

2016 establishments in France
2020 disestablishments in France
Artist-run centres
Contemporary art galleries in France
Defunct art museums and galleries in Paris
Buildings and structures in the 10th arrondissement of Paris
Impact of the COVID-19 pandemic on the arts and cultural heritage
COVID-19 pandemic in France